Bainoceratops (meaning "mountain horned face", after the type locality, Bayn Dzak) is a genus of ceratopsian dinosaur from the late Campanian in the Late Cretaceous. The type species is B. efremovi. Its fossils were found in southern Mongolia in the Djadochta Formation.

History
Viktor Tereshchenko and Vladimir R. Alifanov in 2003 named Bainoceratops efremovi based on a few dorsal (back) vertebrae that were stated to differ from those of Protoceratops, suggesting a closer relationship with Udanoceratops. In 2006 North American paleontologists Peter Makovicky and Mark A. Norell suggested that Bainoceratops may be synonymous with Protoceratops as most of the traits used to separate the former from the latter have been reported from other ceratopsians including Protoceratops itself, and they are more likely to fall within the wide intraspecific variation range of the concurring P. andrewsi. In 2007, in their description of Cerasinops, authors Brenda J. Chinnery and John R. Horner determined Bainoceratops  and other dubious genera to be either a variant or immature specimen of other well-known genera. Based on this reasoning, they excluded Bainoceratops from their phylogenetic analysis.

See also

 Timeline of ceratopsian research

References

Ceratopsians
Late Cretaceous dinosaurs of Asia
Fossil taxa described in 2003
Ornithischian genera